This is a data page for dichlorodifluoromethane.

Physical properties 

Chemical data pages
Chemical data pages cleanup